A drum (also called a barrel) is a cylindrical shipping container used for shipping bulk cargo. Drums can be made of steel, dense paperboard (commonly called a fiber drum), or plastic, and are generally used for the transportation and storage of liquids and powders. Drums are often stackable, and have dimensions designed for efficient warehouse and logistics use.  This type of packaging is frequently certified for transporting dangerous goods. Proper shipment requires the drum to comply with all applicable regulations.

Background

It is common to hear a drum referred to as a barrel and the two terms are used nearly interchangeably. In the United States,  drums are also in common use and have the same height. This allows easy stacking of mixed pallets. Barrels can be constructed of plastic, laminated paperboard or steel.

The two common sub-types of drums are the open top and the welded top (with  NPS bung holes). The latter commonly called "barrels" in preference to drums in the United States. They cannot efficaciously either dispense or be filled with powdered goods, though they might store them very well, so are not used for such goods, being reserved for liquids transport and storage. Plastic drums are manufactured using injection blow moulding technology and have either a separate lid (similar to those on fiber drums) or a welded type top with the bung holes molded in. Metal drums are manufactured with cold-rolled steel sheets, welded themselves into long pipe-like sections then forged on a stamping press into drum bodies. A rolled seam is then made for the drum bottom, or on both the bottom and the top.

Drums have top and (usually) bottom chimes or rims: sometimes called chines.  Most steel drums have reinforcing rolling hoops or rings of thickened metal or plastic.
 This sufficiently strengthens them so that they can readily be turned on their sides and rolled when filled with heavy materials, like liquids. Over short to medium distances, drums can be tipped and rolled on the bottom rim while being held at an angle, balanced, and rotated with a two-handed top grip that also supplies the torque (rotational or rolling force).

The open-top sub-type is sealed by a mechanical ring clamp (concave inwards) that exerts sufficient pressure to hold many non-volatile liquids and make an airtight seal against a gasket, as it exerts force inward and downward when tightened by a normal three-quarter inch wrench or ratchet wrench. Tops exist with bung holes as above, and these hybrid drums with lid can be used to ship many non-volatile liquids as well as industrial powders. Many drums are used to ship and store powdered products as well as liquids, such as plastic beads for injection moulding, extrusion, and purified industrial grade powders like cleansers (e.g., fertilizers, and powdered aluminum). If used to transport dangerous goods across international boundaries, they may need to have UN certification. In general, drum usage is limited to wholesale distribution of bulk products, which are then further processed or sub-divided in a factory.

These metal drums have two openings with flanges, often  NPS and  NPS in diameter. Once the drums are filled, the plugs (bungs) are screwed in the flanges using pneumatic or hand-operated bung tightener (plug wrench).  To secure the contents of the drums against theft and adulteration during shipment, cap-seals made of metal and other types like metal-plastic laminates are used. These cap-seals sit on top of the flanges and are crimped, using a drum cap-seal crimping tool, also called a drum cap sealer. Once cap-seals are crimped, the plugs can be unscrewed only by breaking these cap-seals. Pneumatic and hand-operated cap-seal crimping tools are available. Pneumatic ones are used in production lines for high production.

The fiber drums referred to above will easily hold , and are usually coated internally with a urethane or plastic protective coating. They have steel reinforcement rims at their ends, and are sufficiently strong that this is the only type of drum that is not reinforced in the middle third, but that is almost certainly due to the difficulty in creating a "vee" rib in a paper layer that essentially spirals out from a single end seam.

International standard size

A 200-litre drum (known as a 55-gallon drum in the United States and a 44-gallon drum in the United Kingdom and the rest of the world) is a cylindrical container with a nominal capacity of 200 litres (55 US or 44 imp gal). The exact capacity varies by manufacturer, purpose, or other factors. Standard drums have inside dimensions of  diameter and  height.

The outside dimensions of a 200-litre drum are typically  diameter at the top or bottom rim,  diameter at the chines (ridges around drum), and  height. Exact dimensions are specified in ANSI MH2.

The drums are typically made of steel with a ribbed outer wall to improve rigidity and for rolling. The lids can be welded or secured with a head gasket and bolt ring. They are commonly used for transporting oils, fuels, chemicals, and dry goods. The construction and performance of drums used for shipment of hazardous materials are governed by UN, country, and carrier regulations.

Drums are frequently transported on pallets for ease of handling by a fork truck and for shipping. The drum's size, shape, and weight distribution lends itself to being moved about readily on the loading dock or factory floor with a two-wheeled hand truck. They can be turned on side and rolled. They can also be moved by hand short distances on firm surfaces by tilting and then rolling along the base, or by using a drum handler, which is designed especially for that purpose.

Henry Wehrhahn, employee of Nellie Bly's Iron Clad Manufacturing Company of New York, received two patents in December 1905 that would lead to the modern 55-gallon steel barrel. Use of 200-litre drums became widespread in World War II, the first war in which trucks, cold rolled steel, stamp or pattern forging machinery and welding were widely available. They were first utilized by the Axis powers (Germany and Italy), but were quickly adopted by Allies.  The drums helped win the Guadalcanal Campaign in the first U.S. offensive in the South Pacific Theater. The U.S. Navy could not maintain command of the sea long enough to offload aviation gasoline for aircraft ashore, so the drums were often transported to the island on fast ships, such as destroyers, and shoved over the sides (or, time permitting, lowered in cargo nets). Because gasoline's density is much less than that of water, the drums floated.  Navy Seabees in small craft corralled the drums.

Closed-head steel barrels and drums used for shipment of chemicals and petroleum products have a standardised bunghole arrangement, with one  (DN50) NPT and one  (DN20) NPT threaded bunghole on opposite sides of the top head. Drums can also be made of durable plastic or paperboard and this arrangement is echoed in many plastic drums. Various components can be mounted to the drum, such as drum pumps and bung mixers.

In the past, hazardous waste was often placed in drums of this size and stored in open fields or buried. Over time, some drums would corrode and leak. As a result, these drums have become iconic of pollution problems, even though they have numerous uses and are ubiquitous in commerce. Tests have shown that a leaking 55-gallon drum can disperse its contents over a 1,200 square-foot area of level surface. Drums are often cleaned or re-conditioned and then used for storing or shipping various liquids or materials.

Although crude oil is sometimes shipped in 55-US-gallon drums, the measurement standard of oil in barrels is based on the whiskey containers of the 1870s that measured .  The measure of 42 US or wine gallons corresponds to a wine tierce (third-pipe).  A wine barrel, or  tun, measures .

See also
 Salvage drum
 Intermediate bulk container, for transportation of larger volumes of liquid
 Drum pump
 Drum handler
 Drum wrench

References

Further reading
 Performance tests of selected plastic drums, National Research Council Canada, February 2005. TP 14396E, Transport Canada
 Drop tests of selected steel drums, InNOVAcorp, 2003. TP 14093E, Transport Canada
 Soroka, W, "Fundamentals of Packaging Technology", IoPP, 2002, 
 Yam, K. L., "Encyclopedia of Packaging Technology", John Wiley & Sons, 2009, 
 European Organisation of the Steel Drum Industry: http://www.sefa.be
 Hardwicke, Robert E. 1958. The Oilman's Barrel. Norman, OK: University of Oklahoma Press. OCLC 541956.
 Shagena, Jack L. 2006. An Illustrated History of the Barrel in America. Bel Air, MD: Jack L. Shagena. .
 Stengler, Drum Handling, Ergonomic Best Practices, 2020, DoE LA-UR-20-20218,

External links 

 Steel Drums on How Its Made

Containers
Fuel containers
Shipping containers